Summer of the Flying Saucer is a 2008 Irish family film starring Robert Sheehan , Dan Colley, Hugh O'Conor, Joanne Kernan and Lorcan Cranitch . The film was directed by Martin Duffy.

Voiceover by Nicola Coughlan.

The majority of the film was filmed in Kilkerrin,  Co. Galway, with many people of Kilkerrin and the surrounding villages being able to spot themselves as extras in a plethora of scenes.

Cast 

 Robert Sheehan as Danny
 Dan Colley as Lorcan
 Joanne Kernan Alien Girl / Janis
 Hugh O'Conor as Father Burke
 John Keogh as Dessie O'Connor
 Lorcan Cranitch as Ciaran
 Jens Winter as The Tall Man / Alien Space Pilot

Voice over 

 Nicola Coughlan as Janis voice

External links 

 Summer of the Flying Saucer IMDB

Irish children's films
2008 films
2008 science fiction films
Films set in 1967
Films set in Ireland
Irish science fiction films